Abdullah Al Mulla (Arabic:عبد الله الملا, born 25 March 1995) is an Emirati footballer. He currently plays for Gulf Heroes as a midfielder.

Career
Al Mulla started his career at Dubai and is a product of the Dubai's youth system. and after hem played for Hatta, Masfout, Al Dhaid, and Dibba Al-Hisn.

References

External links
 

1995 births
Living people
Emirati footballers
Dubai CSC players
Hatta Club players
Masfout Club players
Al Dhaid SC players
Dibba Al-Hisn Sports Club players
Gulf Heroes FC players
UAE Pro League players
UAE First Division League players
Association football midfielders
Place of birth missing (living people)